The List of shipwrecks in the 1730s includes some ships sunk, wrecked or otherwise lost during the 1730s.

1730

March
(Dates from 1 January to 24 March 1730 under the calendar used now were considered 1729 "old style" by the British at the time.  Within the British Empire, the start of the New Year was on 25 March though it was on 1 January in other European nations.  In addition, the British still used the Julian calendar, which was 11 days behind the Gregorian calendar by 1730; thus, 3 March 1730 "new style" would have been 18 February 1729 "old style").

3 March

August

2 August

October

2 October

Unknown date

1731

November

Unknown date

January

8 January

August

19 August

Unknown date

1732

May

22 May

June

24 June

1733

July

15 July

November

17 November

December

21 December

1734

September

10 September

November

17 November

Unknown date

1735

February

3 February

1736

January

1 January

Unknown date

1737

June

29 June

July

1 July

4 July 1737

Unknown date

January

Unknown date

October

13 October

Unknown date

1738

December

27 December

March

10 March

21 March

September

17 September

Unknown date

1739

December

19 December

February

19 February

September

20 September

Notes
 Until 1752, the year began on Lady Day (25 March) Thus 24 March 1730 was followed by 25 March 1731. 31 December 1731 was followed by 1 January 1731.

References

1730s